Berlin is recognized as a world city of culture and creative industries. Numerous cultural institutions, many of which enjoy international reputation are representing the diverse heritage of the city. Many young people, cultural entrepreneurs and international artists continue to settle in the city.  Berlin has established itself as a popular nightlife and  entertainment center in Europe.

The expanding cultural role of Berlin was underscored  by the relocation of several entertainment companies after 2000 who decided to move their headquarters and main studios to the banks of the River Spree. The city has a very diverse art scene and is home to over 300 art galleries. In 2005, Berlin was awarded the title "City of Design" by UNESCO.

Creative industries

Berlin is an important center of the European and German film industry. It is home to more than 1000 film and television production companies and 270 movie theaters. Also, 300 national and international co-productions are filmed in the region every year. The historic Babelsberg Studios and the production company UFA are located outside Berlin in Potsdam. The city is also home of the European Film Academy and the German Film Academy, and hosts the annual Berlin International Film Festival. Founded in 1951, the festival has been celebrated annually in February since 1978. With over 430,000 admissions it is the largest publicly attended film festival in the world.

Berlin is home to many international and regional television and radio stations. The public broadcaster RBB has its headquarters in Berlin as well as the commercial broadcasters Welt. German international public broadcaster Deutsche Welle has its TV production unit in Berlin, and most national German broadcasters have a studio in the city. 

Berlin has Germany's largest number of daily newspapers, with numerous local broadsheets (Berliner Morgenpost, Berliner Zeitung, Der Tagesspiegel), and three major tabloids, as well as national dailies of varying sizes, each with a different political affiliation, such as Die Welt, Junge Welt, Neues Deutschland, and Die Tageszeitung. The Exberliner, a monthly magazine, is Berlin's English-language periodical focusing on arts and entertainment. Berlin is also the headquarters of the two major German-language publishing houses Walter de Gruyter and Springer, each of which publish books, periodicals, and multimedia products.

Industries that do business in the creative arts and entertainment are an important and sizable sector of the economy of Berlin. The creative arts sector comprises music, film, advertising, architecture, art, design, fashion, performing arts, publishing, R&D, software, TV, radio, and video games. Around 22,600 creative enterprises, predominantly SMEs, generated over 18.6 billion Euro in total revenue. Berlin's creative industries have contributed an estimated 20% of Berlin's gross domestic product in 2005.

Nightlife and festivals

Berlin's nightlife is one of the most diverse and vibrant of its kind in Europe. Throughout the 1990s, people in their twenties from many countries, particularly those in Eastern and Central Europe, made Berlin's club scene the premier nightlife destination of Europe. After the fall of the Berlin Wall in 1989, many historic buildings in Mitte, the former city center of East Berlin, were illegally occupied and re-built by young squatters and became a fertile ground for underground and counterculture gatherings. Mitte and surrounding boroughs are also home to many nightclubs including techno clubs Tresor, WMF, Ufo, E-Werk, KitKatClub and Berghain. The techno-music club, Linientreu, near the Kaiser Wilhelm Memorial Church, has been in business since the late 1980s. The LaBelle discothèque in Friedenau became widely known as the location of the 1986 Berlin discotheque bombing. Berlin is notable for the length of its parties. Clubs are not required to close at a fixed time on the weekends, and many parties last well into the morning, or all weekend.

The SO36 in Kreuzberg originally focused largely on punk music, but today has become a popular venue for many dances and parties. SOUND, located from 1971 to 1988 in Tiergarten and today in Charlottenburg, gained notoriety in the late 1970s for its popularity with heroin users and other drug addicts as described in Christiane F.'s book Wir Kinder vom Bahnhof Zoo.

The Karneval der Kulturen, a multi-ethnic street parade celebrated every Pentecost weekend, and the Christopher Street Day are both supported by the city's government. Berlin is also well known for the cultural festival, Berliner Festspiele, which include the jazz festival JazzFest Berlin. Several technology and media art festivals and conferences are held in the city, including Transmediale and Chaos Communication Congress.

Berlin has a long history of gay culture and influence on popular entertainment, and according to some authors, in the 1920s the city was the Gay Capital of Europe. Today, the city has a huge number of gay clubs and festivals, such as Easter Fetish Week (Easter in Berlin), Christopher Street Day (Berlin Pride)—central Europe's largest gay-lesbian pride event celebrated on the last weekend of June—Folsom Europe and Hustlaball. Berlin is also leading Europe in the number of fetish clubs. "Easter in Berlin" and "Folsom Europe Berlin" are the biggest gay fetish festivals in Europe. Annual gay highlights in Berlin are also the gay and lesbian street festival in Berlin-Schöneberg (Lesbisch-schwules Stadtfest) and Kreuzberg Pride in June. The largest gay areas in Berlin are in Schöneberg close to Nollendorfplatz and in Prenzlauer Berg at the Schönhauser Allee subway station.

The "Down Under Berlin – Australian Film Festival" was founded in Berlin in 2011 as an event dedicated to the presentation of Australian and New Zealand film. The diverse festival, which is Europe's largest film festival on the film work of the two largest nations of the Australasia region, was held at Kreuzberg's "Moviemento" cinema in 2014.
In 2015, Berlin will be the first host of the Lollapalooza festival in Europe.

Museums and galleries

Berlin is currently at the leading edge of the global contemporary art scene. There are over 600 art galleries in the city. It is estimated that 6,000 to 7,000 artists live in the city, with a quarter of them being from outside Germany. The beginnings of the modern boom in Berlin's art scene were during the 1990s. In 1995, a Berlin art fair, Art Forum Berlin, was first held. The Berlin Biennale for contemporary artists, held every June, began in 1998. Galleries have grown steadily in number since then. Galleries and artists' residences are mostly found in the neighbourhoods in Mitte (particularly along Auguststraße), Kreuzberg, Wedding, and Charlottenburg.

Berlin is home to 153 museums. The ensemble on the Museum Island is a UNESCO World Heritage Site and is situated in the northern part of the Spree Island between the Spree and the Kupfergraben. As early as 1841, it was designated a "district dedicated to art and antiquities" by royal decree. Subsequently, the Altes Museum (Old Museum) in the Lustgarten displaying the bust of Queen Nefertiti, the Neues Museum (New Museum), Alte Nationalgalerie (Old National Gallery), Pergamon Museum, and Bode Museum were built there. While these buildings once housed distinct collections, the names of the buildings no longer necessarily correspond to the names of their collections.

Apart from the Museum Island, there are many additional museums in the city. The Gemäldegalerie (Painting Gallery) focuses on the paintings of the Old Masters from the 13th to the 18th centuries, while the Neue Nationalgalerie (New National Gallery, built by Ludwig Mies van der Rohe) specializes in 20th century European painting. The Hamburger Bahnhof, located in Moabit, exhibits a major collection of modern and contemporary art. In spring 2006, the expanded Deutsches Historisches Museum re-opened in the Zeughaus with an overview of German history through the fall of the Berlin Wall in 1989. The Bauhaus Archive is an architecture museum.

The Jewish Museum has a standing exhibition on two millennia of German-Jewish history. The German Museum of Technology in Kreuzberg has a large collection of historical technical artifacts. The Museum für Naturkunde exhibits natural history near Berlin Hauptbahnhof. It has the largest mounted dinosaur in the world (a brachiosaurus), and a preserved specimen of the early bird Archaeopteryx.

In Dahlem, there are several museums of world art and culture, such as the Museum of Asian Art, the Ethnological Museum, the Museum of European Cultures, as well as the Allied Museum (a museum of the Cold War) and the Brücke Museum (an art museum). In Lichtenberg, on the grounds of the former East German Ministry for State Security (Stasi), is the Stasi Museum. The site of Checkpoint Charlie, one of the most renowned crossing points of the Berlin Wall, is still preserved and also has a museum, a private venture which exhibits comprehensive documentation of detailed plans and strategies devised by people who tried to flee from the East. The Beate Uhse Erotic Museum near Zoo Station claims to be the world's largest erotic museum.

Performing arts

Berlin has evolved and earned its reputation as a leading European city with its high art scene and dynamic, cutting-edge performances. Berlin is home to more than 50 theaters. The Deutsches Theater in Mitte was built in 1849–50 and has operated continuously since then, except for a one-year break (1944–45) due to the Second World War. The Volksbühne at Rosa Luxemburg Platz was built in 1913–14, though the company had been founded in 1890. The Berliner Ensemble, famous for performing the works of Bertolt Brecht, was established in 1949, not far from the Deutsches Theater. The Schaubühne was founded in 1962 in a building in Kreuzberg, but in 1981 moved to the building of the former Universum Cinema on Kurfürstendamm. With a seating capacity of 1,895 and a stage floor of 2,854 square metres (30,720 square feet), the Friedrichstadt-Palast in Berlin Mitte is the largest show palace in Europe.

Berlin has three major opera houses: the Deutsche Oper, the Berlin State Opera, and the Komische Oper. The Berlin State Opera on Unter den Linden opened in 1742 and is the oldest of the three. Its current musical director is Daniel Barenboim. The Komische Oper has traditionally specialized in operettas and is located at Unter den Linden as well. The Deutsche Oper opened in 1912 in Charlottenburg. During the division of the city from 1961 to 1989 it was the only major opera house in West Berlin.

There are seven symphony orchestras in Berlin. The Berlin Philharmonic Orchestra is one of the preeminent orchestras in the world; it is housed in the Berliner Philharmonie near Potsdamer Platz on a street named for the orchestra's longest-serving conductor, Herbert von Karajan. The current principal conductor is Simon Rattle. The Konzerthausorchester Berlin was founded in 1952 as the orchestra for East Berlin, since the Philharmonic was based in West Berlin. Its current principal conductor is Lothar Zagrosek. The Haus der Kulturen der Welt presents various exhibitions dealing with intercultural issues and stages world music and conferences.

Architecture

Berlin's architecture combines elements from almost all periods and all styles. Emblematic of Berlin, the Brandenburg Gate is a renowned landmark in the city. There the world-famous boulevard Unter den Linden begins. Walking along and making small detours from this avenue one can catch a glimpse of the State Opera House, admire the Hedwig's Cathedral or take a closer look at the collections of the Old Museum, which reveal a microcosm of cultural excellence. Berlin landmarks, such as the Gendarmenmarkt and the French and German Cathedral (including the Schauspielhaus), are the highest examples of the city's Classicist architecture.

The list of significant structures goes further with the Sanssouci Palace in Potsdam, where one can find the famous terraces designed by Knobelsdorff, as well as the Neues Palais and Orangerie. From among the numerous monuments of Berlin, one of the most famous is the Schiller statue, which reminds the visitors of the city's powerful literary tradition.

Important collections of art can be found at the monumental Pergamon Museum, whose building resembles an ancient temple. Since the reunification of 1989, you can get there by a boat-ride on the Spree River (which passes by the Reichstagsgebäude – government buildings) or on foot, strolling through the historic inner city. Although much of the great art collections of former Berlin suffered the consequences of World War II, many paintings were saved stored in salt mines.

Some pieces of art were preserved in the eastern part of the country, including a collection of ancient treasures discovered by 19th- and early 20th-century German archaeologists, and later were distributed among Berlin's numerous museums. The Charlottenburg Palace, set west of Tiergarten, offers enormous museum collections and royal apartments, while the Schlossgarten Charlottenburg is an example of truly beautiful landscape architecture. Another landmark is the Mausoleum with the tombs of Friedrich Wilhelm II and Queen Louise, which serves as an important memorial to the history of the Royal Family of Prussia.

Recent history of Berlin is reflected in the New Wall: a partial reconstruction of 70 metres of the Berlin Wall in Bernauer Strasse and Acker Strasse. It incorporates segments of the original wall, but is mainly made of steel and has tiny holes through which visitors may take a look to the other side. Other sites commemorating the city's dark era include the Memorial to the Murdered Jews of Europe, which occupies a vast area in central Berlin and comprises 2,711 columns symbolising gravestones. The memorial, designed by architect Peter Eisenman, is set south of the Brandenburger Gate and was erected for the 60th anniversary of the end of World War II.

Religious heritage is best represented by the 15th-century Gothic Marienkirche, which boasts a compelling image of a Danse Macabre. Industrial Art Nouveau can be seen at the building of Hackesche Hofe, a site laden with fashionable boutiques and art galleries.

The Nikolaiviertel is the place where Medieval and Baroque monuments are situated. In its centre, there is the 13th-century Nikolaikirche, Berlin's oldest church. The building of the Kongresshalle, as well as the Philharmonie, where the world-famous Berlin Philharmonic Orchestra resides were designed according to the trends of mid-20th-Century architecture. Additionally, the city is thriving with the most modern architectural designs, some of which are lacking structural logic, but nevertheless, Berlin continues to evolve as a unified world metropolis.

Cuisine

Berlin is home to a diverse gastronomy scene reflecting the immigrant history of the city. Twelve restaurants in Berlin have been included in the Michelin guide, which ranks the city at the top for the number of its restaurants having this distinction in Germany. Apart from that, Berlin is well known for its vast offering of vegetarian, vegan and otherwise sustainability-oriented food, such as fair trade goods or organic food. Berlin is one of the cities with the most vegetarian and vegan restaurants in the world.

Many local foods originated from north-German culinary traditions and include rustic and hearty dishes with pork, goose, fish, peas, beans, cucumbers or potatoes.

Turkish and Arab immigrant workers brought their culinary traditions to the city; for example, the döner kebab, falafel and lahmacun, which have become common fast-food staples. The modern fast-food version of the döner was invented in Berlin in 1971.

Recreation

Zoologischer Garten Berlin, the older of two zoos in the city, was founded in 1844, and presents the most diverse range of species in the world. It was the home of the captive-born celebrity polar bear Knut, born in December 2006. The city's other zoo is Tierpark Friedrichsfelde, founded in 1955 on the grounds of Schloss Friedrichsfelde in the Borough of Lichtenberg.

Berlin's Botanischer Garten includes the Botanic Museum Berlin. Other gardens in the city include the Britzer Garten, site of the 1985 Bundesgartenschau, and the Erholungspark Marzahn, promoted under the name Gardens of the world.

The Tiergarten is Berlin's largest park located in Mitte and was designed by Peter Joseph Lenné. In Kreuzberg the Viktoriapark provides a good viewing point over the southern part of inner city Berlin. Treptower Park beside the Spree in Treptow has a monument honoring the Soviet soldiers killed in the 1945 Battle of Berlin. The Volkspark in Friedrichshain, which opened in 1848, is the oldest park in the city. Its summit is man-made and covers a Second World War bunker and rubble from the ruins of the city; at its foot is Germany's main memorial to Polish soldiers.

Berlin is known for its numerous beach bars along the river Spree. Together with the countless cafés, restaurants and green spaces in all districts, they create an important source of recreation and leisure time.

Sports

Berlin has established a high-profile reputation as a host city of international sporting events. Berlin hosted the 1936 Olympics and was the host city for the 2006 FIFA World Cup Final. The IAAF World Championships in Athletics were held in the Olympiastadion in August 2009. The annual Berlin Marathon and the annual ÅF Golden League event ISTAF for athletics are also held here. The FIVB World Tour has chosen an inner-city site near Alexanderplatz to present a beach volleyball Grand Slam every year.

Open Air gatherings of several hundred thousands spectators have become popular during international football competitions, like the World Cup or the UEFA European Football Championship. Many fans and viewers gather to watch the matches on huge video screens. The event is known as the Fan Mile and takes place at the Brandenburg Gate every two years.

Several major clubs representing the most popular spectator sports in Germany have their base in Berlin.

Quotations

 "Berlin ist eine Stadt, verdammt dazu, ewig zu werden, niemals zu sein" ("Berlin is a city condemned always to become, never to be.")(Karl Scheffler, author of Berlin: Ein Stadtschicksal, 1910)
 "Ich hab noch einen Koffer in Berlin" ("I still have a suitcase in Berlin")(Marlene Dietrich, 1951 song by the actress and singer born in Berlin-Schöneberg.)
 "Ich bin ein Berliner". ("I am a citizen of Berlin") (John F. Kennedy, President of the United States, 1963 while visiting Berlin)
 "The greatest cultural extravaganza that one could imagine."(David Bowie, singer, on 1970s Berlin)
 "Berlin wird leben und die Mauer wird fallen." ("Berlin will live and the wall will fall.")(Willy Brandt, Former Governing Mayor of West Berlin and chancellor of Germany, 10 November 1989)
 "Berlin ist arm, aber sexy." ("Berlin is poor, but sexy.") (Klaus Wowereit, Governing Mayor, in a press interview, 2003)

Image gallery

See also

Berolina, personification of the city
Berlinerisch dialect
List of sights in Berlin
List of museums and galleries in Berlin
 List of people from Berlin

References

Literature

External links 

Berlin.de—Official Website
Regional directory 
Berlin Tourist Information
English-language city guide for Berlin